Cairnleith Crofts is a group of dwellings in Ythanbank, Aberdeenshire, Scotland.

References

Villages in Aberdeenshire